Pack is an unincorporated community in McDonald County, in the U.S. state of Missouri.

History
A post office called Pack was established in 1904, and remained in operation until 1906.

References

Unincorporated communities in McDonald County, Missouri
Unincorporated communities in Missouri